AFLG may refer to:

American Family Legacy Group LLC
Australian Football League Germany
American Football League (1926) (the "G" referred to star player Red Grange)